The Black Rider is a 1954 British crime thriller film directed by Wolf Rilla and starring Jimmy Hanley, Rona Anderson, and Leslie Dwyer. It was produced as a low budget second feature for release by Butcher's Film Service. It was shot at the Walton Studios near London. The film's sets were designed by the art director John Stoll.

Premise
In a small seaside town in Southern England Jerry Marsh, a young reporter and amateur motorcyclist, investigates sightings of a hooded black figure on a motorbike. It turns out that a gang of smugglers use a haunted castle as their base, deterring curious locals by pretending to be ghosts.

Cast
 Jimmy Hanley as Jerry Marsh
 Rona Anderson as Mary Plack
 Leslie Dwyer as Robert Plack
 Lionel Jeffries as Martin Bremner
 Beatrice Varley as Mrs. Marsh
 Michael Golden as Rakoff
 Valerie Hanson as Karen
 Vincent Ball as Ted Lintott
 Edwin Richfield as Geoff Morgan
 Kenneth Connor as George Amble
 Robert Rietti as Mario
 James Raglan as Rackton
 Frank Atkinson as Landlord
 Edie Martin as Elderly Lady
 Peter Swanwick as Holiday-maker

Recent assessments
Britmovie writs that the "plot is seemingly lifted almost intact from the pages of a Boys' Own adventure or the writings of children’s author Enid Blyton. ... Of particular note here is Lionel Jeffries (The Revenge of Frankenstein 1958) as the villain of the piece. Although only in his late 20s, Jeffries already looks much older than his years and effortlessly brings to the role the gravitas it requires. ... Jeffries also succeeds in making A.R. Rawlinson’s mediocre dialogue sound far better than it actually is. ... This is a surprisingly stylish piece of filmmaking overall. Most importantly, [the director Wolf] Rilla succeeds in keeping the narrative moving at a brisk pace. At a time when low-budget British productions remained resolutely studio-bound, The Black Rider features a refreshing amount of exterior footage. Among the lengthiest sequences occurring outdoors is an obstacle course at a fete that takes on an almost newsreel-like quality."

According to TV Guide, "the only thing discomfiting about this film is the poor direction and inept acting" (those are two things).

References

External links

1954 films
1950s crime thriller films
Films directed by Wolf Rilla
British crime thriller films
British black-and-white films
Butcher's Film Service films
Films set in England
Films shot at Nettlefold Studios
1950s English-language films
1950s British films